Tyrosine-protein kinase Fes/Fps also known as proto-oncogene c-Fes/Fps is an enzyme that in humans is encoded by the FES gene. FES was originally cloned as a retroviral oncogene from feline (v-FES) and avian (v-FPS) sarcomas. This triggered the subsequent identification and cloning of the cellular FES (c-FES) genes (also referred to as FPS) in birds and mammals.

Function 

This gene encodes the human cellular counterpart of a feline sarcoma retrovirus protein with transforming capabilities. The gene product has tyrosine-specific protein kinase activity and that activity is required for maintenance of cellular transformation. Its chromosomal location has linked it to a specific translocation event identified in patients with acute promyelocytic leukemia but it is also involved in normal hematopoiesis. A truncated transcript has been identified that is generated utilizing a start site in one of the far downstream exons but a protein product associated with this transcript has not been identified.

Interactions 

Feline sarcoma oncogene has been shown to interact with BCAR1 and BCR gene.

References

Further reading

External links 
 

Tyrosine kinases